Sir John Stephen Willison, FRSC (November 9, 1856 – May 27, 1927) was a Canadian newspaperman, author, and businessman.

Born near Hills Green, Huron County, Upper Canada, the son of Stephen Willison, a blacksmith, and Jane Abram, Willison left school at the age of 15. After working as an assistant teacher and a clerk, he started working in journalism with the London Advertiser in 1881 and then with the Globe in 1883. In 1886, he reported from the Parliamentary Press Gallery in Ottawa, Ontario. While in Ottawa he became friends with future Prime Minister of Canada Wilfrid Laurier.

In 1890, Willison was appointed editor of the Globe. In 1900, he was elected president of the Canadian Press Association and became a Fellow of the Royal Society of Canada. In 1903, his book Sir Wilfrid Laurier and the Liberal party: a political history was published.

In 1902, he left the Globe and went to work at The Toronto Evening News. In 1908, he was appointed the Canadian correspondent of the British newspaper The Times. In 1919, his memoir Reminiscences, political and personal was published.

In 1913, he was made a Knight Bachelor.

He died in Toronto in 1927.

Further reading
 Sir Wilfrid Laurier and the Liberal Party; a political history, Volume 1 at Archive.org
 Sir Wilfrid Laurier and the Liberal Party : a political history, Volume 2 at Archive.org
 The new Canada : a survey of the conditions and problems of the Dominion at Archive.org
 Reminiscences, political and personal at Archive.org

References

External links
 
 

1856 births
1927 deaths
Canadian journalists
Canadian Knights Bachelor
Canadian memoirists
Fellows of the Royal Society of Canada
People from Huron County, Ontario
The Times people
Persons of National Historic Significance (Canada)